Ramona Dolores Fanego de Miño (27 March 1903 – 6 November 1976) was a Paraguayan politician. In 1963 she and Bienvenida de Sánchez became the first female members of the Chamber of Deputies.

Biography
De Miño was born in Villeta in March 1903. She trained to be a teacher and taught in her hometown for several years. During the Chaco War she established the Commission for Assistance to the Combatants of Chaco, which provided food and medicine to soldiers.

Following the war, she joined the Colorado Party. She was a Colorado Party candidate in the 1963 elections and was elected to the Chamber of Deputies, becoming one of the first two female members alongside Bienvenida de Sánchez.

She died in November 1973.

References

1903 births
People from Villeta
Paraguayan schoolteachers
Paraguayan women educators
Members of the Chamber of Deputies of Paraguay
Paraguayan women in politics
Colorado Party (Paraguay) politicians
1973 deaths